is a public university at Yokosuka, Kanagawa Prefecture,  Japan.

The school was established in 2003, and specializes in human welfare studies.

External links
 Official website 

Educational institutions established in 2003
Public universities in Japan
Universities and colleges in Kanagawa Prefecture
Buildings and structures in Yokosuka, Kanagawa
2003 establishments in Japan